The United Nations Federal Credit Union is an American credit union, with a head office in Long Island City, in New York State. It was founded in 1947 by United Nations employees.

In October 2010 UNFCU began issuing chip-and-PIN cards to its customers, the first institution in the United States to do so. UNFCU membership is open to employees, consultants and retirees of the United Nations and affiliated agencies, including the World Bank and the International Monetary Fund, as well as their family members. It is also open to United Nations volunteers and those affiliated with the United Nations International School.

References

Credit unions based in New York (state)
Companies based in New York City
Banks established in 1947
United Nations properties
1947 establishments in New York City